Bornabad (also Romanized as Bornābād and Barnābād; also known as Bornābād-e Bālā (Persian: برناباد بالا), also Romanized as Bornābād Bālā) is a village in Pachehlak-e Sharqi Rural District, in the Central District of Aligudarz County, Lorestan Province, Iran. At the 2006 census, its population was 294, in 53 families.

References 

Towns and villages in Aligudarz County